Aleksandr Shumidub (17 March 1964 – 13 July 2019) was a Belarusian ice hockey player and manager. Shumidud played in the Soviet Hockey League and the Russian Superleague for HC Dinamo Minsk. He competed in the men's tournament at the 1998 Winter Olympics for Belarus.

References

External links

1964 births
2019 deaths
Soviet ice hockey players
HC Dinamo Minsk players
KH Sanok players
Olympic ice hockey players of Belarus
Ice hockey players at the 1998 Winter Olympics
Ice hockey people from Minsk